Table Mountain is located near the northern end of the Great Western Divide, a sub-range of the Sierra Nevada in California.

Clarence King of the Whitney Survey mentioned in his notes that "At one place the ridge [Great Western Divide] forms a level table." The name Table appeared on Charles F. Hoffmann's  map of 1873. In 1881 the mountain was named Mount Hazen in honor of General Hazen, the Chief Signal Officer of the U.S. Army. In 1905, the Board on Geographic Names recognized the name Table Mountain. This name appeared on both the Tehipite and the Mt. Whitney USGS 30' maps published in 1905 and 1907 respectively.

It is the tallest of the 21 peaks named Table Mountain in California.

References

External links 
 

Mountains of Kings Canyon National Park
Mountains of Sequoia National Park
Mountains of Tulare County, California
Mountains of Northern California